Hachimycin, also known as trichomycin, is a polyene macrolide antibiotic, antiprotozoal, and antifungal derived from streptomyces. It was first described in 1950, and in most research cases have been used for gynecological infections.

References 

Antibiotics
Macrolide antibiotics
Polyenes